Pudong Shangri-La, East Shanghai, often abridged as Pudong Shangri-La, is a hotel located at 33 Fucheng Lu (富城路33号, 近银城东路) in Pudong, Shanghai, China. It is part of the Shangri-La Hotels and Resorts chain.

References

External links

 
 
 

1998 establishments in China
Hotel buildings completed in 1998
Hotels established in 1998
Hotels in Shanghai
Pudong
Shangri-La Hotels and Resorts